Friedrichsfelde is a Berlin U-Bahn station located on the  in the Friedrichsfelde district.

History
It opened on 21 December 1930 as the terminus of Berlin's new eastern U-Bahn line from Alexanderplatz, then called Line E. Alfred Grenander designed its stations in a uniform style. Friedrichsfelde is distinguished by its blue colours - formerly wall tiles, since a 2004 restoration enamel panels.

On 26 February 1945, it was destroyed in World War II.

The line was not extended before 25 June 1973, when Tierpark station opened as the new eastern terminus with direct access to the zoo.

U5 (Berlin U-Bahn) stations
Buildings and structures in Lichtenberg
Railway stations with vitreous enamel panels
Railway stations in Germany opened in 1930